Ignacio Cervantes Kawanag (Havana, 31 July 1847 – Havana, 29 April 1905) was a Cuban pianist and composer. He was influential in the creolization of Cuban music.

A child prodigy, he was taught by pianist Juan Miguel Joval, later by composer and tutor Nicolás Ruiz Espadero in 1859, and by the visiting American composer Louis Moreau Gottschalk. Gottschalk encouraged Cervantes to study at the Conservatoire de Paris (1866–1870) under Antoine François Marmontel and Charles-Valentin Alkan, where he was awarded first prizes in composition (1866) and harmony (1867). He also performed with Christina Nilsson and Adelina Patti.

In 1875 Cervantes and José White left Cuba when warned by the Governor-General: he had found out that they had been giving concerts all over the country to raise money for the rebel cause in the Ten Years' War. In the United States and Mexico Cervantes continued to raise money by giving concerts until the Pact of Zanjón brought a lull in conflict. He returned in 1878 and left again in 1895 when the Cuban War of Independence started.

Cervantes wrote one opera (Maledetto, 1895), various chamber pieces (Scherzo cappricioso, 1885), zarzuelas, and the famous forty-one Danzas Cubanas. He also conducted for the Opera company at Havana's Payret Theater. His Fusión de Almas was written to his daughter, María Cervantes (1885–1981), who became a well-known pianist, composer and singer.

"Cervantes was one of the first musicians in the Americas to consider nationalism to be a consequence of a people's distinct character; he was thus a great forebear to later composers."

References

External links
 "Te quiero tanto" Performance and commentary by Joseph Smith: "This danza has a text secretly hidden in the rhythm of the music..."
Complete Cuban Dances scores of Ignacio Cervantes for piano from Cuatro 40 Ediciones

ignaciocervantes.icm.cu, international performance contest
Ignacio Cervantes at the Classical Composers Database
Six cuban dances (1899) From Sibley Music Library Digital Scores Collection
 Duets for Flute and Clarinet featuring Cervantes' 12 most celebrated Cuban Dances http://clarinetdd.com/sheet-music-store.html 

1847 births
1905 deaths
19th-century classical composers
19th-century classical pianists
19th-century male musicians
20th-century classical composers
20th-century classical pianists
20th-century male musicians
Romantic composers
Cuban classical composers
Cuban classical pianists
Cuban opera composers
Male classical composers
Male classical pianists
Contradanza
People from Havana